Culex rajah is a species of mosquito in the genus Culex.  It is endemic to Sabah, Malaysian Borneo.  C. rajah is placed in the subgenus Culiciomyia.  In its larval stage, C. rajah is found exclusively in the pitchers of Nepenthes rajah (hence the name), a species of pitcher plant.  As such, it is considered a nepenthebiont.

References

 Clarke, C.M. 1997. Nepenthes of Borneo.  Natural History Publications (Borneo), Kota Kinabalu, p. 39.

rajah
Insects described in 1986
Nepenthes infauna